Sir Mohammad Abdur Rahman (1888–1962) was a lawyer and judge from Pakistan born in Delhi, India. He served as a representative of the country of India for the United Nations Special Committee on Palestine (UNSCOP) in the summer of 1947.

Early career 
Prior to joining UNSCOP, Rahman began practicing law in Delhi in 1908. He quickly rose in the ranks and became Dean of the Law College (1927–1934) and later became the Vice Chancellor, a position he held until 1938. He was the first Muslim Vice Chancellor of Delhi University. He was then appointed judge of the Madras High Court in 1937, and then the High Court at Lahore in February 1943. Just a year later, he became Vice Chancellor of Punjab University in Lahore in addition to his High Court duties.

Role in the United Nations Special Committee on Palestine 

In May 1947 he was appointed to UNSCOP by Indian National Congress President Jawaharlal Nehru. At the end of UNSCOP, Sir Abdur Rahman supported the Minority Plan for a Federal State in Palestine. He also included a Special Note that reflected his desire for either a Federal State or a Unitary state due to his belief in the sanctity of the spirit of the UN Charter.

After UNSCOP, Rahman went home to Lahore, which had become a part of Pakistan due to the Partition of India on August 15, 1947. His family, which fled from Delhi after partition, soon joined him. He was later appointed to the Federal Court of Pakistan, a precursor to the Supreme Court of Pakistan.

Personal life 
One of Sir Abdur Rahman's grandchildren is the award-winning chemist and former Minister of Science and Technology of Pakistan, Atta-ur-Rahman from Pakistan.

References

Further reading 

University of the Punjab alumni
Pakistani judges
Vice-Chancellors of the University of the Punjab
Israeli–Palestinian conflict and the United Nations
People of the Israeli–Palestinian conflict
1888 births
1962 deaths